Jennifer Elise Foerster is a poet, writer, and teacher.  She has published three poetry books and served as Associate Editor for When the Light of the World Was Subdued Our Songs Came Through, A Norton Anthology of Native Nations Poetry (2020), and has been published in numerous journal publications and anthologies. Her 2013 book Leaving Tulsa was a finalist for the shortlist of the 2014 PEN/Open Book Award.

Early life and family
Foerster's father was in the U.S. Air Force, so she grew up living in many cities in the U.S. and Europe. While she is now based in San Francisco, California, Foerster belongs to the Muscogee Nation, a Native American Nation located in Oklahoma. In addition to her Mvskoke relatives, she is of German and Dutch heritage.

Education
Foerster earned her Bachelor of Fine Arts from the Institute of American Indian Arts, Master of Fine Arts from Vermont College of Fine Arts, and PhD in Literary Arts from the University of Denver. She also has received fellowships, including the NEA Creative Writing Fellowship (2017), a Lannan Foundation Writing Residency Fellowship (2014), a Robert Frost Fellow in Poetry at Breadloaf (2017), and a Wallace Stegner Fellow in Poetry at Stanford (2008–2010).

Works 
Her poetry works are:
Leaving Tulsa (University of Arizona Press, 2013)
Bright Raft in the Afterweather (University of Arizona Press, 2018)
The Maybe-Bird (The Song Cave, 2022)

References 

American women poets
Year of birth missing (living people)
Native American women writers
Muscogee (Creek) Nation people
Poets from California
Institute of American Indian Arts alumni
Vermont College of Fine Arts alumni
University of Denver alumni
Living people
21st-century Native Americans
21st-century Native American women